"Forgiven, Not Forgotten" is the second single by Irish band the Corrs, released in 1996. Warner's International territories released "Forgiven, Not Forgotten" as the second single from the album of the same name, while Atlantic US went straight to "The Right Time".

Music video

Just one day after this video was shot, the Corrs were also filming the video for their next single, "The Right Time". However, Atlantic US skipped "Forgiven, Not Forgotten" and did not release it as a single.

The theme for the video is dark and brooding, which fits to the more serious lyrics about someone who has committed suicide and left someone else behind. The band is all dressed in black, the girl's makeup is very pale and there is not a lot of smiling. The video itself is pretty lowkey but yet effective in showing the Corrs on a rotating platform with various landscapes appearing behind them. "Forgiven Not Forgotten" was shot in Santa Monica, California.

Not only did the platform make some of the viewers nauseous, but Andrea felt seasick after being on the circling stage for hours. The shoot took from about 7:00am to 11:00pm to film.

Track listings
UK cassette single
 "Forgiven, Not Forgotten" (LP version) – 4:16
 "Forgiven, Not Forgotten" (live acoustic version) – 3:54

US CD and cassette single
 "Forgiven, Not Forgotten" (radio album version) – 4:16
 "Forgiven, Not Forgotten" (live acoustic version) – 3:54

European and Australian maxi-single
 "Forgiven, Not Forgotten" (LP version) – 4:16
 "Forgiven, Not Forgotten" (live acoustic version) – 3:54
 "Heaven Knows" (LP version) – 4:18

Charts

Release history

References

143 Records singles
1990s ballads
1995 songs
1996 singles
Atlantic Records singles
The Corrs songs
Lava Records singles
Rock ballads
Song recordings produced by David Foster
Songs written by Andrea Corr
Songs written by Caroline Corr
Songs written by Jim Corr
Songs written by Sharon Corr